Thomas Robert Fernie (1 February 1890 – 13 December 1952) was a Scottish professional golfer. He won the Scottish Professional Championship four times and finished in 5th place in the 1923 Open Championship. He was the son of Willie Fernie who won the 1883 Open Championship.

Golf career
Fernie won the Scottish Professional Championship four times, in 1909, 1910, 1919 and 1920 and was runner-up in 1922 and 1925. He was also runner-up in the 1910 Dunlop Cup. In 1911 Fernie became professional at Turnberry. He finished in 5th place in the 1923 Open Championship. The following year he withdrew from the Open qualifying because of the death of his father. He was tied for 4th after the first day of the 1925 Open Championship but had a poor final day and finished tied for 14h place. In 1926 he left Turnberry and became the professional at Royal Lytham & St Annes Golf Club. In the 1933 Open Championship on the Old Course at St Andrews he started with a 70 and was tied for second place. He scored 78 in the second round and failed to return his card on the final day.

Death
Fernie died in the Blackpool Victoria Hospital, Lancashire on 13 December 1952 aged 62. His estate was valued at over £13,000. After retiring from Royal Lytham & St Annes Golf Club, Fernie had become a sports outfitter in Lytham St Annes.

Tournament wins
1909 Scottish Professional Championship
1910 Scottish Professional Championship
1919 Scottish Professional Championship
1920 Scottish Professional Championship

Results in major championships

Note: Fernie only played in The Open Championship.

NT = No tournament
WD = withdrew
? = finish unknown
CUT = missed the half-way cut
"T" indicates a tie for a place

Team appearances
England–Scotland Professional Match (representing Scotland): 1910, 1912 (tie), 1913, 1933

References

Scottish male golfers
People from Troon
Sportspeople from South Ayrshire
1890 births
1952 deaths